Argia or Argea may refer to:

Entomology
 Argia, a genus of damselflies
 Argeia (isopod), a genus of isopod parasites in the family Bopyridae

Mythology
Argia (mythology), several mythological figures bearing this name

Other
 Argia Sbolenfi, a pseudonym of Italian poet Olindo Guerrini
 Argia (magazine), the oldest magazine published in Basque language
 Argia (schooner), a schooner located in Mystic, Connecticut
Argea, a village in Ploscuțeni Commune, Vrancea County, Romania
Argeia (region), a region of ancient Greece